Events in the year 1952 in Turkey.

Parliament
 9th Parliament of Turkey

Incumbents
President – Celal Bayar
Prime Minister – Adnan Menderes
Leader of the opposition – İsmet İnönü

Ruling party and the main opposition
  Ruling party – Democrat Party (DP) 
  Main opposition – Republican People's Party (CHP)

Cabinet
20th government of Turkey

Events
3 January – 1952 Hasankale earthquake
18 February – Turkey became a member of NATO
16 June – The ban on the female Ottoman dynasty members to enter Turkey was lifted
20 August – Günseli Başar won the European Beauty pageant
22 November – Attempted assassination of journalist Ahmet Emin Yalman.
24 December – Upon Fuat Köprülü's proposal, the Turkish wording of the constitıion was partially changed to Ottoman Turkish

Births
8 April – Ahmet Piriştina, mayor of İzmir 
20 April – Erol Küçükbakırcı, cyclist
23 May – Hayati Yazıcı, politician
1 June – Şenol Güneş, football coach
1 June – Ali Müfit Gürtuna, politician
9 June – Bülent Ersoy, singer
2 September – Salih Memecan, caricaturist
28 June – Enis Batur, writer and publisher

Deaths
5 February – Ömer Fevzi Eyüboğlu (born in 1884), journalist
13 March – Ömer Rıza Doğrul (born 1893), publisher and politician
16 May – Memduh Şevket Esendal (born in 1884), writer
28 December – Kerim Erim (born 1894), mathematician and physicist.

Gallery

See also
Turkey at the 1952 Summer Olympics

References

 
Years of the 20th century in Turkey
Turkey
Turkey
Turkey